Emil Benny (born 19 September 2000) is an Indian professional footballer who plays as a midfielder for Indian Super League club NorthEast United.

Career

Gokulam Kerala
Born in Kerala, Emil Benny made his first professional appearance for Gokulam Kerala FC on 9 January 2021 as 86th minute substitute.

At the 2022 AFC Cup group-stage opener, Benny and his side achieved a historic 4–2 win against Indian Super League side ATK Mohun Bagan.

NorthEast United
On 20 August 2022, NorthEast United announced the signing of Benny from Gokulam Kerala on a multiyear deal . He made his debut for the club on 2 September against Sudeva Delhi in Durand Cup and won the match in 2-0 scoreline.

Career statistics

Club

Honours
Gokulam Kerala
I-League: 2020–21, 2021–22

Individual
I-League emerging player of the season: 2020–21
I-League Team of the season: 2020–21

References

2000 births
Living people
People from Wayanad district
Footballers from Kerala
Indian footballers
Association football forwards
I-League players
Gokulam Kerala FC players
NorthEast United FC players
I-League 2nd Division players
Kerala Blasters FC Reserves and Academy players